Shangdang District (Chinese: 上党区; pinyin: Shàngdǎng Qū), formerly Changzhi County, is a district in southeastern Shanxi province, China. It is under the administration of Changzhi city, and is located in southern Changzhi.

References
www.xzqh.org 

County-level divisions of Shanxi
Changzhi